Fullerton Junction railway station served the village of Fullerton, Hampshire, England. It was on the Sprat and Winkle Line and the Fullerton to Hurstbourne Line.

History 
Fullerton Bridge station, on the Sprat and Winkle line, opened on 6 March 1865. It was renamed Fullerton in 1871. When the Hurstbourne-Fullerton branch opened on 2 February 1885, the platforms were moved slightly to the south. The station was re-named Fullerton Junction in 1889 but it was changed back on 7 July 1929. The station master's house remained at the original site. The branch to Hurstbourne closed for passengers in 1931 and totally in 1956. The station closed along with the Kimbridge Junction to Andover Junction section of the Sprat and Winkle on 7 September 1964. The track was lifted and the buildings at the Junction station were demolished, although the platforms survive, covered in trees. The buildings at the original station are now private houses.

References 

Disused railway stations in Hampshire
Former London and South Western Railway stations
Railway stations in Great Britain opened in 1885
Railway stations in Great Britain closed in 1964
1885 establishments in England
1964 disestablishments in England
Beeching closures in England